Citrus reticulata x medica may refer to one of several hybrids between a mandarin orange and citron:

Rangpur lime, Citrus limonia
Rough lemon, Citrus jambhiri
Volkamer lemon, Citrus volkameriana